Adelheid Morath (born 2 August 1984) is a German cross-country mountain biker. At the 2012 Summer Olympics, she competed in the Women's cross-country at Hadleigh Farm, finishing in 16th place. She also competed at the 2008 Olympics, finishing 18th. She was on the start list of 2018 Cross-Country European Championships and finished 16.

References

External links 
 
 
 
 

1984 births
Living people
Cross-country mountain bikers
Cyclists at the 2008 Summer Olympics
Cyclists at the 2012 Summer Olympics
German female cyclists
Marathon mountain bikers
Olympic cyclists of Germany
Sportspeople from Freiburg im Breisgau
German mountain bikers
Cyclists from Baden-Württemberg
20th-century German women
21st-century German women